Le Pas is a commune in the Mayenne department in north-western France.  Le Pas is a village located in the north of the Department of Mayenne. It is 10 km from Gorron, 42 km from Laval and 18 km from Mayenne.

The village was liberated by American soldiers on 6 August 1944; a fact which is recorded at the war memorial.

Sites of interest

The menhir of Saint-Civière is a historic monument.

The church of St. Martin, was dedicated on October 8, 1787 and has two bells named Renee and Magdelaine.

Nearest settlements

See also
Communes of Mayenne

References

Pas